Local elections held in Iligan City last May 13, 2019 as part of the Philippine general election. Registered voters elected officials for the local posts in the city: the mayor, vice mayor, the one congressman, and twelve councilors.
At the end of filing of certificates of candidacy (COC) last October 2018, a total of 54 hopefuls have filed their COC for city's 15 elective positions: 4 are running for congressman, 4 for mayor, 3 for vice-mayor, and 13 for city councilors.

On May 14, 2019, the incumbent mayor, vice-mayor, and congressman were declared winners by the city board of canvassers at the session hall of the Sangguniang Panlungsod. There were 184,058 eligible voters in the city for this election, and there were 133,537 votes cast, giving a voter turnout of 72.55%.

Lone District Representative

Frederick Siao (NP) is the incumbent. He was reelected for his second term as district representative.

Mayor
Celso Regencia (PDP-Laban) is the incumbent. Regencia won via landslide against businessman  Marianito Alemania (NP) and reelected for his 3rd and final term as city mayor.

Vice Mayor
Jemar Vera-Cruz (PDP-Laban) is the incumbent and reelected for his second term as vice-mayor.

City Councilors
Below is the result of election for city councilors. Parties are stated on their certificate of candidacies. A total of 41 hopefuls ran for 12 city assemblymen posts. 

|bgcolor=black colspan=5|

References

External links
COMELEC - Official website of the Philippine Commission on Elections (COMELEC)
NAMFREL - Official website of National Movement for Free Elections (NAMFREL)
PPCRV - Official website of the Parish Pastoral Council for Responsible Voting (PPCRV)

2019 Philippine local elections
Politics of Iligan
May 2019 events in the Philippines